Nikolas Mattheou (born 7 May 1998 in Limassol) is a Cypriot professional footballer who plays as a winger.

Club career
Mattheou started from Apollon Limassol youth clubs, and he moved to PAOK youth clubs in 2014. On 1 June 2016, Mattheou signed a three year contract with PAOK. He was an used substitute at the 2016–17 Greek Football Cup final. On 23 June 2017, Mattheou was loaned to Anorthosis Famagusta. On 30 September 2017 he made his debut in 1–1 draw, against AEK Larnaca. Mattheou replaced Giorgos Economides at the 88th minute, and made the assist to Demba Camara who tied the game at the 91st minute.

On 22 July 2019, Mattheou returned to his childhood club Apollon Limassol FC on a three-year contract. On 4 September, he was loaned out to Aris Limassol FC for the 2019-20 season.

References

External links

1998 births
Living people
Cypriot footballers
Cypriot expatriate footballers
Cyprus youth international footballers
PAOK FC players
Anorthosis Famagusta F.C. players
A.E. Karaiskakis F.C. players
Apollon Limassol FC players
Aris Limassol FC players
Cypriot expatriates in Greece
Expatriate footballers in Greece
Sportspeople from Limassol
Association football wingers